Biconvex may refer to:
 Biconvex bipartite graph
 Biconvex lens
 Biconvex optimization